EMCS may refer to:

 IEEE Electromagnetic Compatibility Society
 Edward Milne Community School, a secondary school in Sooke, British Columbia